Chester Ittner Bliss (February 1, 1899 – March 14, 1979) was primarily a biologist, who is best known for his contributions to statistics. He was born in Springfield, Ohio in 1899 and died in 1979. He was the first secretary of the International Biometric Society.

Academic qualifications

Bachelor of Arts in Entomology from Ohio State University, 1921
Master of Arts from Columbia University, 1922
PhD from Columbia University, 1926

Remarkably, his statistical knowledge was largely self-taught and developed according to the problems he wanted to solve (Cochran & Finney 1979).
Nevertheless, in 1942 he was elected as a Fellow of the American Statistical Association.

Major contributions
The idea of the probit function was published by Bliss in a 1934 article in Science on how to treat data such as the percentage of a pest killed by a pesticide. Bliss proposed transforming the percentage killed into a "probability unit" (or "probit").

Arguably his most important contribution was the development, with Ronald Fisher, of an iterative approach to finding maximum likelihood estimates in the probit method of bioassay. Additional contributions in biological assay were work on the analysis of time-mortality data and of slope-ratio assays (Cochran & Finney 1979).

Bliss introduced the word rankit, meaning an expected normal order statistic.

References

Citations

Sources 

 C. I. Bliss (1935) The calculation of the dosage-mortality curve, Annals of Applied Biology 22, 134–167. (includes appendix by Fisher.)
 W. G. Cochran, D. J. Finney. 1979 Chester Ittner Bliss, 1899–1979, Biometrics; 35(4): 715–717. pdf
 D. J. Finney. 1980 Chester Ittner Bliss, 1899–1979, Journal of the Royal Statistical Society, Series A, 143(1): 92–93.
 T. R. Holford & C. White (2005) Bliss, Chester Ittner, Encyclopedia of Biostatistics.

External links
 University of Adelaide: Correspondence between C. I. Bliss and R. A. Fisher
 University of Adelaide: Fisher's appendix to Bliss (1935)
 Chester Ittner Bliss papers (MS 1165). Manuscripts and Archives, Yale University Library. 
 

1899 births
1979 deaths
American statisticians
Fellows of the American Statistical Association
Columbia Graduate School of Arts and Sciences alumni